This is a list of members who have ever been elected to the Senedd, since its first election in 1999 as the National Assembly for Wales.

The number assigned to each MS is arbitrary and does not indicate any kind of rank or seniority. It is only for use in this table. To date 161 individuals have served as MSs (formerly AMs before 2020).

See also

 Members of the 1st National Assembly for Wales
 Members of the 2nd National Assembly for Wales
 Members of the 3rd National Assembly for Wales
 Members of the 4th National Assembly for Wales
 Members of the 5th National Assembly for Wales
 Members of the 6th Senedd
 List of by-elections to the Senedd
 Regional Member changes to the Senedd

References